Lê Thu Huyền (born 2 June 1994) is a Vietnamese badminton player from Hanoi. She won a bronze medal at the 2012 Asian Junior Championships in Gimcheon, South Korea with her partner in mixed doubles Đỗ Tuấn Đức. In the senior international event, she won the 2011 Kenya International in the mixed doubles with Lê Hà Anh, and 2015 Eurasia Bulgaria International in the women's doubles with Phạm Như Thảo.

Achievements

Asian Junior Championships 
Mixed doubles

BWF International Challenge/Series (3  titles, 1 runner-up) 
Women's singles

Women's doubles

Mixed doubles

  BWF International Challenge tournament
  BWF International Series tournament
  BWF Future Series tournament

References

External links 
 

1994 births
Living people
Sportspeople from Hanoi
Vietnamese female badminton players
Badminton players at the 2014 Asian Games
Asian Games competitors for Vietnam
Competitors at the 2011 Southeast Asian Games
Competitors at the 2013 Southeast Asian Games
Competitors at the 2017 Southeast Asian Games
21st-century Vietnamese women
Southeast Asian Games competitors for Vietnam